Anamudi is a mountain located in Ernakulam district and Idukki district of the Indian state of Kerala. The name Anamudi literally translates to "elephant's head" a reference to the resemblance of the mountain to an elephant's head.
Anamudi is the highest mountain in peninsular India as well as the largest mountain in Kerala. 

The first recorded ascent of Anamudi was by General Douglas Hamilton of the Madras Army on 4 May 1862, but it is likely that there had been earlier ascents by local people.

Anamudi peak is one of only three ultra prominent peaks in South India. It is also the peak with the greatest topographic isolation within India. It is the highest point in India south of Himalayas. Thus it is known as "Everest of South India".
The peak is not exceptionally dramatic in term of steepness or local relief and is a fault-block mountain. It is located in the southern region of Eravikulam National Park at the junction of the Cardamom Hills, the Anaimalai Hills and the Palani Hills. The north and south slopes are gentle, while the east and west slopes are steeper, with more difficult rock faces.

Anamudi and the Eravikulam National Park surrounding it is home to the largest surviving population of the Nilgiri tahr (Nilgiritragus hylocrius). Asian elephants, gaur, Bengal tigers, and the Nilgiri marten (Martes gwatkinsii)  are some of the species of animals found here . The Anamudi peak area is also habitat of a unique frog Raorchestes resplendens. This newly discovered species is located in the Eravikulam National Park and is restricted to less than three km2 on the summit of Anamudi. The summit of the Anamudi is vegetated with patches of stunted Arundinaria densifolia and Gaultheria fragrantissima (wintergreen), Anaphalis sp., Impatiens and some species of Eriocaulon.

Geology 
Anamudi is located within a larger tectonic province, a Neoproterozoic mobile belt known as the Southern Granulite Terrane (SGT) or alternatively, the Pandyan Mobile Belt.  This geologic province represents an area of Archean rocks that were deeply buried during the Neoproterozoic Pan-African Orogeny, as part of the Mozambique Belt, in which developed Himalayan-scale mountains when West and East Gondwana collided due to the closure of the ancient Mozambique Ocean.  Specifically, Anamudi is located within a geological subprovince of the SGT known as the Madurai Province.  The mountain massif itself is composed of Neoproterzoic A-type granite known as Munnar Granite, which was intruded deep into the thickened crust of the SGT during Orogenic collapse of the Pan-African highlands.  After approximately 800-500 million years of burial, the Munnar Granite of the Anamundi massif is now exposed high above sea level due to a combination of faulting and unroofing.

Climatic zones and biomes 
Anamudi is also the highest point in South India. The peak is the highest point of the Periyar River basin.
Köppen-Geiger climate classification system classifies it as subtropical highland (Cwb). Sholas are found in its valleys, like most meadows of the Western Ghats.

Gallery

See also
 Eravikulam National Park
 Munnar
 Pallivasal
 Pooyamkutty

Citations

References
 .

External links 

 Beautiful natural sound of flowing water on Anamudi slope near peak

 Highest peaks in Southern India

Mountains of the Western Ghats
Mountains of Kerala
Geography of Idukki district
Two-thousanders of Asia
Highest points of Indian states and union territories
Tourist attractions in Idukki district
Tourist attractions in Kerala